Für Dich (also spelled Für dich; "For You") is a 2016 album by German singer Vanessa Mai.

Track listing
"Ich sterb für dich"
"Wie ein Blitz"
"Ich hör auf mein Herz"
"Phänomenal"
"Herz an Herz"
"Ohne dich"
"Meilenweit"
Willst du oder nicht"
"Du und ich"
"Wir sind heut schwindelfrei"
"Ich liebe dich"
"Für dich" (Yvonne Catterfeld cover)
"Wunder gibt's nicht nur im Himmel"
"Kann's nicht glauben"

References

2016 albums